The Darmois–Skitovich theorem  is one of the most famous characterization theorems of mathematical statistics. It characterizes the normal distribution (the Gaussian distribution) by the independence of two linear forms from independent random variables. This theorem was proved independently by G. Darmois and V. P. Skitovich in 1953.

Formulation 
Let   be independent random variables. Let   be nonzero constants.

History 
The Darmois–Skitovich theorem is a generalization of the Kac–Bernstein theorem in which the normal distribution  (the Gaussian distribution) is characterized by the independence of the sum and the difference of two independent random variables. For a history of proving the theorem by V. P. Skitovich, see the article

Information sources

 Darmois, G. (1953). Analyse generale des liaisons stochastiques. Rev.Inst.Intern.Stat (21): 2—8.
 Skitivic, V. P. (1953). "On a property of the normal distribution." Dokl. Akad. Nauk SSSR (N.S.) (89): 217—219 (in Russian).
 A. M. Kagan, Yu. V. Linnik, and C. R. Rao, Characterization Problems in Mathematical Statistics, Wiley, New York (1973).

References 

Mathematical theorems